The second 1960 Major League Baseball All-Star Game was the 29th playing of Major League Baseball's annual midsummer exhibition game. The game took place at Yankee Stadium in New York City, home of the American League's New York Yankees. The National League won the game by a score of 6–0. The National League hit four home runs, tying an All-Star Game record.

Rosters
Players in italics have since been inducted into the National Baseball Hall of Fame.

American League

National League

-x – Injured and could not play
-y – Injury replacement

Game
For many local New York fans, the second All-Star Game marked the return of Willie Mays to New York. Against starting pitcher Whitey Ford, Mays led off the game with a single, then homered in the third. Eddie Mathews and Stan Musial also hit home runs in the game. The All-Star game also marked the nineteenth and final All-Star appearance of Ted Williams, who left the competition with a .304 average, four home runs, twelve runs batted in and ten runs scored.

Umpires: Nestor Chylak, Home Plate (AL); Dusty Boggess, First Base (NL); Jim Honochick, Second Base (AL); Tom Gorman, Third Base (NL);  Johnny Stevens, Left Field (AL); Vinnie Smith, Right Field (NL)

Starting lineups

Game Summary

References

External links
 1960 All-Star Game on Baseball Almanac
 1960 All-Star Game on Baseball-Reference.com

Major League Baseball All-Star Game
Major League Baseball All-Star Game
Sports in the Bronx
Major League Baseball All Star Game
Baseball competitions in New York City
July 1960 sports events in the United States